The 2018 U Sports football season began on August 24, 2018 with the St. Francis Xavier X-Men visiting the Saint Mary's Huskies in Halifax, Nova Scotia. The Quebec Student Sport Federation teams played an hour later with the Laval Rouge et Or visiting the Sherbrooke Vert et Or and the McGill Redmen playing the Montreal Carabins. The Ontario University Athletics teams began play on August 25, 2018 and the Canada West teams opened their season one week later on August 31, 2018.

The conference championships were played on November 10 and the season will conclude on November 24 with the 54th Vanier Cup championship at PEPS Stadium in Quebec City, Quebec. 27 university teams in Canada are scheduled to play U Sports football, the highest level of amateur Canadian football.

Regular season

Standings

Post-season awards

Award-winners

All-Canadian Team

Post-season 
The Vanier Cup is played between the champions of the Mitchell Bowl and the Uteck Bowl, the national semi-final games. In 2018, according to the rotating schedule, the Canada West Hardy Trophy championship team will visit the Yates Cup Ontario championship team for the Mitchell Bowl. The winners of the Atlantic conference's Loney Bowl will visit the Québec conference Dunsmore Cup championship team for the Uteck Bowl.

Conference Playoffs

Atlantic University Sport

Réseau du sport étudiant du Québec

Ontario University Athletics

Canada West Universities Athletic Association

National Semifinals

National Championship

References

2018 in Canadian football
U Sports football seasons